Jamie O'Brien may refer to:
Jamie O'Brien (footballer) (born 1990), Irish professional football player
Jamie O'Brien (surfer) (born 1983), surfer from Hawaii
Jamie O'Brien (beauty queen) (born 1988), from Maryland

See also
James O'Brien (disambiguation)